This is a list of number-one hits by New Zealand artists in New Zealand from the Official New Zealand Music Chart singles chart.

List 

Key
 – Number-one single of the year.
 – Number-one single of the year, of New Zealand origin.

Notes
 Gotye was born in Belgium but raised in Australia. Kimbra is from New Zealand.

New Zealand artists with the most number-one hits 

These totals includes singles when the artist is 'featured'—that is, not the main artist.

 – includes duet or collaboration by two New Zealand artists.
 –  includes songs whose chart placings predate the Official New Zealand Music Chart which began in May 1975.

Singles with most weeks at number one  

 –  includes songs whose chart placings predate the Official New Zealand Music Chart which began in May 1975.

References 
 Charts.org.nz - NZ singles charts (Recorded Music NZ)
 The Official NZ Music Charts (Hung Medien)

New Zealand music-related lists
Lists of number-one songs in New Zealand